is a Japanese footballer currently playing as a defender for Toho Titanium.

Career statistics

Club
.

Notes

References

1998 births
Living people
Association football people from Kanagawa Prefecture
Niigata University of Health and Welfare alumni
Japanese footballers
Japanese expatriate footballers
Association football defenders
Shonan Bellmare players
Albirex Niigata Singapore FC players
Toho Titanium SC players
Japanese expatriate sportspeople in Singapore
Expatriate footballers in Singapore